The 2021 Adriatica Ionica Race/Sulle Rotte della Serenissima was a road cycling stage race that took place between 15 and 17 June 2021 in the northeastern Italy. It was the third edition of the Adriatica Ionica Race and a category 2.1 event on the 2021 UCI Europe Tour.

After the 2020 edition was cancelled due to the COVID-19 pandemic, the race made its return in 2021, though it was forced to downscale to three stages from the usual five.

Teams 
One UCI WorldTeam, six UCI ProTeams, seven UCI Continental teams, and two national teams made up the sixteen teams that participated in the race. Of the 110 riders who started the race, 88 finished.

UCI WorldTeams

 

UCI ProTeams

 
 
 
 
 
 

UCI Continental Teams

 
 
 
 
 
 
 

National Teams

 Colombia
 Italy

Route 
The full race route details were revealed in a press conference on 10 June 2021.

Stages

Stage 1 
15 June 2021 – Trieste to Aviano, 

The first stage, in Friuli Venezia Giulia, headed west from Trieste, with a slightly undulating route and one categorized climb on the way to Aviano.

Stage 2 
16 June 2021 – Vittorio Veneto to Cima Grappa, 

Stage 3 
17 June 2021 – Ferrara to Comacchio, 

With the third and final stage, the race heads south into Emilia-Romagna: starting in Ferrara, riders will race towards the Adriatic coast and finish in Comacchio. Though this stage lacks much elevation gain, it does feature two laps of a  circuit in the second half of the stage that includes three sectors of dirt roads per lap.

Classification leadership table 

 On stage 2, Matteo Donegà, who was third in the points classification, wore the red jersey, because first placed Elia Viviani wore the blue jersey as the leader of the general classification and second placed Davide Persico wore the white jersey as the leader of the young rider classification.
 On stage 3, Merhawi Kudus, who was second in the mountains classification, wore the green jersey, because first placed Lorenzo Fortunato wore the blue jersey as the leader of the general classification.

Final classification standings

General classification

Points classification

Mountains classification

Young rider classification

Team classification

References

Sources

External links 
 

2021 UCI Europe Tour
2021 in Italian sport
June 2021 sports events in Italy